McGrew is a surname, and may refer to:

 James McGrew (1813-1910), American politician, merchant, banker and hospital director
 John McGrew (circa 1910-1999), American animator, painter and musician 
 Lance McGrew, American NASCAR crew chief
 Larry McGrew (1957-2004), retired American football linebacker
 Reggie McGrew (born 1976), American football defensive tackle
 Sam McGrew (born 1984), former American football linebacker